John Gamble may refer to:
 John Gamble (musician) (died 1687), musician and song collector
 John Gamble (priest) (1762–1811), British Anglican clergyman and military chaplain
 John M. Gamble (1791–1836), officer in the United States Marine Corps
 John William Gamble (1799–1873), businessman and political figure in Upper Canada and Canada West
 John Rankin Gamble (1848–1891), U.S. Representative from South Dakota
 John Marshall Gamble (1863–1957), American painter
 John A. Gamble (1933–2009), Canadian politician
 John Gamble (baseball) (1948–2022), Major League Baseball shortstop
 John Gamble (American football) (active 1981–2012), American football player, powerlifter and strongman competitor
 John Gamble (record producer) (1960–2020), American record producer

See also
 John Gamble Kirkwood (1907–1959), scientist